Abbey Green (born 22 January 1997) is a retired Australian rules footballer who played for North Melbourne and Collingwood in the AFL Women's (AFLW).

State football
Green played for Launceston in the Tasmanian Women's Football League (TWFL), and was a standout player, being selected for three seasons in a row for the league's Team of the Year. In June 2019, Green represented Melbourne University in a VFL Women's match against Western Bulldogs. In the match she collected 17 disposals, took five marks and had 10 hitouts.

AFLW career

North Melbourne
Green was drafted by North Melbourne with the 79th pick of the 2019 AFL Women's draft. She kicked two goals in two games in North Melbourne's inaugural season.

Collingwood
In August 2020, Green was traded to Collingwood in exchange for the 40th pick of the 2020 AFL Women's draft. After the 2021 season, Green announced her retirement after not playing a single game for Collingwood.

Statistics
Statistics are correct to the end of the 2021 season.

|- style="background-color: #eaeaea"
! scope="row" style="text-align:center" | 2020
|style="text-align:center;"|
| 26 || 2 || 2 || 0 || 8 || 2 || 10 || 2 || 1 || 1.0 || 0.0 || 4.0 || 1.0 || 5.0 || 1.0 || 0.5
|- 
! scope="row" style="text-align:center" | 2021
|style="text-align:center;"|
| 4 || 0 || – || – || – || – || – || – || – || – || – || – || – || – || – || –
|- class="sortbottom"
! colspan=3| Career
! 2
! 2
! 0
! 8
! 2
! 10
! 2
! 1
! 1.0
! 0.0
! 4.0
! 1.0
! 5.0
! 1.0
! 0.5
|}

References

External links
 
 

Living people
1997 births
North Melbourne Football Club (AFLW) players
Australian rules footballers from Tasmania
Sportswomen from Tasmania